Thatta Thattaha Maha Bawdi Pagoda is a Buddhist temple on Udayaraṃsi hillock in Pobbathiri Township, Naypyidaw Union Territory, Myanmar (Burma). The pagoda is a replica of the Mahabodhi Temple in Bodh Gaya, Bihar, India.

The buddhābhiṣeka ritual of the pagoda's main Buddha image was held on 13 May 2014.

The complex also houses replicas of key locations in Gautama Buddha's life (သံဝေဇနိယလေးဌာန), including his birth, his enlightenment, his preaching and his death, built for worshippers who have difficulties making a pilgrimage to Bodh Gaya.

See also
Buddhism in Myanmar

References

Buddhist temples in Myanmar
Buildings and structures in Naypyidaw
21st-century Buddhist temples
Religious buildings and structures completed in 2015
2015 establishments in Myanmar